Phenacyl bromide is the organic compound with the formula C6H5C(O)CH2Br.  This colourless solid is a powerful lachrymator as well as a useful precursor to other organic compounds.

It is prepared by bromination of acetophenone:

C6H5C(O)CH3  +  Br2   →  C6H5C(O)CH2Br  +  HBr

The compound was first reported in 1871.

References

External links

Lachrymatory agents
Organobromides